
Year 474 BC was a year of the pre-Julian Roman calendar. At the time, it was known as the Year of the Consulship of Medullinus and Vulso (or, less frequently, year 280 Ab urbe condita). The denomination 474 BC for this year has been used since the early medieval period, when the Anno Domini calendar era became the prevalent method in Europe for naming years.

Events 
 By place 

 Italy 
 Hiero I, tyrant of Syracuse, allied with naval  forces  from  the  maritime  Greek  cities of southern Italy defeats the Etruscan navy in the Battle of Cumae as the Etruscans try to capture the Greek city of Cumae. This victory marks the end of the Etruscan aggression against the Greeks in southern Italy and saves the Greeks of Campania from Etruscan domination.
 Taras signs an alliance with Rhegion, to counter the Messapians, Peucetians, and Lucanians, but the joint armies of the Tarentines and Rhegines are defeated near Kailia.
 Hiero builds Castello Aragonese on the island of Ischia.

 By topic 

 Literature 
 The Greek poet Pindar moves to Thebes after two years at the Sicilian Court of Hiero I of Syracuse.  While at Thebes, he composes lyric odes to celebrate triumphs in the Olympic Games and other athletic events.

Births 
Pandukabhaya of Anuradhapura, ruler of Sri Lanka

Deaths

References